What Love Is is a 2007 romantic comedy film, written and directed by Mars Callahan and starring Cuba Gooding Jr., Matthew Lillard, Sean Astin, Anne Heche, and Gina Gershon.

Premise
The film is shot one evening, mostly in a man's apartment (Cuba Gooding, Jr.) on the Valentine's Day he intends to propose to his girlfriend. Before he can pop the question, he arrives home to discover she has mostly moved out. Then, several childhood friends and  later several women arrive for a planned Valentine's party, all of which give their takes on relationships, love and interacting.

Reception
The film has received 15% at Rotten Tomatoes and a 14 on Metacritic. It made roughly $19,000 at 42 theaters during its theatrical run.

Home media
The film was released on DVD on April 1, 2008.

References

External links 
 
 
 
 "What Love Is at Worst Previews"
 "IBC2006 Innovation Awards - Creation Category Shortlisted Project Title: Digital Cinematography - What Love Is"
 "FilmStream Production on What Love Is", by Jon Silberg, Videography, May 14, 2006

2007 films
2007 romantic comedy films
American romantic comedy films
2000s English-language films
Films directed by Mars Callahan
2000s American films